The 2022 NHL Entry Draft was the 60th NHL Entry Draft. The draft was held on July 7–8, 2022, at the Bell Centre in Montreal, Quebec. Montreal were originally scheduled to host the 2020 draft but were unable to do so due to the COVID-19 pandemic. For the first time since 1985, the team hosting the draft selected first overall.

The first three selections were Juraj Slafkovsky going to the hosting Montreal Canadiens, Simon Nemec being selected by the New Jersey Devils, and Logan Cooley being picked by the Arizona Coyotes. The selections of Slovak players Slafkovsky and Nemec made this the second time that the top two draftees came from a single European country, after Russians Alexander Ovechkin and Evgeni Malkin in 2004.

Eligibility
Ice hockey players born between January 1, 2002, and September 15, 2004, were eligible for selection in the 2022 NHL Entry Draft. Additionally, un-drafted, non-North American players born in 2001 were eligible for the draft; and those players who were drafted in the 2020 NHL Entry Draft, but not signed by an NHL team and who were born after June 30, 2002, were also eligible to re-enter the draft.

Draft lottery
Beginning with the 2014–15 NHL season the NHL changed the weighting system that was used in previous years. Under the new system the odds of winning the draft lottery for the four lowest finishing teams in the league decreased, while the odds for the other non-playoff teams increased. As the league reduced the number of lottery drawings before the 2021–22 season, this resulted in two lotteries being held for this draft. Beginning with this lottery and continuing onward, the teams winning one of the two drawings are allowed to move up a maximum of ten spots in the draft order and a team is only allowed to win the lottery twice in a five-year period. As a result only the eleven lowest finishing teams were eligible to win the first overall selection. The team that won the first drawing would move up to the first selection if they were seeded 1–11, teams seeded 12–16 would move up ten spots. If the team seeded 12 won the first draw they would secure the second overall pick and the team seeded first would secure the first overall pick. For the second draw, the fifteen remaining teams were re-seeded and the teams seeded 1–12 could move up to the second overall pick if it was still available after the end of the first draw, teams seeded 13–15 could move up a maximum of ten spots. If the second overall pick was not available to the winner of the second draw that team would be awarded the next highest available selection. After the two draws were complete, all remaining draft picks were assigned to the remaining teams in inverse order of regular season finish.

The Montreal Canadiens and New Jersey Devils won the two draft lotteries that took place on May 10, 2022, giving them the first and second picks overall. Montreal retained the first pick, while New Jersey moved up three spots. Arizona, Seattle and Philadelphia each dropped one spot to third, fourth and fifth overall, respectively.

{| class="wikitable"
|+ Complete draft position odds
! Team
! 1st
! 2nd
! 3rd
! 4th
! 5th
! 6th
! 7th
! 8th
! 9th
! 10th
! 11th
! 12th
! 13th
! 14th
! 15th
! 16th
|-
! Montreal
|style="background:#A9D0F5;"| 25.5% || 18.8% || 55.7% || || || || || || || || || || || || ||
|-
! Arizona
| 13.5% || 14.4% ||style="background:#DDDDDD;"| 32.0% || 40.2% || || || || || || || || || || || ||
|-
! Seattle
| 11.5% || 11.5% || 7.4% ||style="background:#DDDDDD;"| 40.7% || 28.8% || || || || || || || || || || ||
|-
! Philadelphia
| 9.5% || 9.8% || || 15.4% ||style="background:#DDDDDD;"| 44.9% || 20.5% || || || || || || || || || ||
|-
! New Jersey
| 8.5% ||style="background:#F5A9BC;"| 8.8% || || || 24.5% || 44.2% || 13.9% || || || || || || || || ||
|-
! Chicago
| 7.5% || 7.9% || || || ||style="background:#DDDDDD;"| 34.1% || 41.4% || 9.1% || || || || || || || ||
|-
! Ottawa
| 6.5% || 6.9% || || || || ||style="background:#DDDDDD;"| 44.4% || 36.5% || 5.6% || || || || || || ||
|-
! Detroit
| 6.0% || 6.4% || || || || || ||style="background:#DDDDDD;"| 54.4% || 30.0% || 3.2% || || || || || ||
|-
! Buffalo
| 5.0% || 5.4% || || || || || || ||style="background:#DDDDDD;"| 64.4% || 23.5% || 1.7% || || || || ||
|-
! Anaheim
| 3.5% || 3.8% || || || || || || || ||style="background:#DDDDDD;"| 73.3% || 18.4% || 0.9% || || || ||
|-
! San Jose
| 3.0% || 3.3% || || || || || || || || ||style="background:#DDDDDD;"| 79.9% || 13.4% || 0.5% || || ||
|-
! Columbus
| || 2.9% || 2.4% || || || || || || || || ||style="background:#DDDDDD;"| 85.7% || 8.9% || 0.2% || ||
|-
! NY Islanders
| || || 2.6% || 1.7% || || || || || || || || ||style="background:#DDDDDD;"| 90.7% || 5.1% || >0.0% ||
|-
! Winnipeg
| || || || 2.1% || 1.0% || || || || || || || || ||style="background:#DDDDDD;"| 94.7% || 2.1% || >0.0%
|-
! Vancouver
| || || || || 0.8% || 0.3% || || || || || || || || ||style="background:#DDDDDD;"| 97.9% || 1.1%
|-
! Vegas
| || || || || || 0.8% || 0.2% || || || || || || || || ||style="background:#DDDDDD;"| 98.9%
|}

Top prospects
Source: NHL Central Scouting (May 5, 2022) ranking.

Selections by round
The order of the 2022 Entry Draft is listed below.

Round one

Notes
 The Chicago Blackhawks' first-round pick went to the Columbus Blue Jackets as the result of a trade on July 23, 2021, that sent Seth Jones, Tampa Bay's first-round pick in 2021 and a sixth-round pick in 2022 to Chicago in exchange for Adam Boqvist, a first and second-round pick both in 2021 and this pick (being conditional at the time of the trade). The condition – Columbus will receive a first-round pick in 2022 if Chicago does not win either of the two draws in the 2022 Draft Lottery – was converted when the Blackhawks did not win either draw in the 2022 draft lottery on May 10, 2022.
 The Ottawa Senators' first-round pick went to the Chicago Blackhawks as the result of a trade on July 7, 2022, that sent Alex DeBrincat to Ottawa in exchange for a second-round pick in 2022, a third-round pick in 2024 and this pick.
 The San Jose Sharks' first-round pick went to the Arizona Coyotes as the result of a trade on July 7, 2022, that sent Carolina's first-round-pick in 2022 (27th overall), a second-round pick in 2022 (34th overall) and the Islanders' second-round pick in 2022 (45th overall) to San Jose in exchange for this pick.
 The New York Islanders' first-round pick went to the Chicago Blackhawks as the result of a trade on July 7, 2022, that sent Kirby Dach to Montreal in exchange for a third-round pick in 2022 (66th overall) and this pick.
Montreal previously acquired this pick as the result of a trade on July 7, 2022, that sent Alexander Romanov and a fourth-round pick in 2022 (98th overall) to the Islanders in exchange for this pick.
 The Vegas Golden Knights' first-round pick went to the Buffalo Sabres as the result of a trade on November 4, 2021, that sent Jack Eichel and a conditional third-round pick in 2023 to Vegas in exchange for Alex Tuch, Peyton Krebs, a conditional second-round pick in 2023 and this pick (being conditional at the time of the trade). The condition – Buffalo will receive a first-round pick in 2022 if Vegas' first-round pick is outside of the top ten selections – was converted when the Golden Knights did not win either draw in the 2022 draft lottery on May 10, 2022.
 The Los Angeles Kings' first-round pick went to the Minnesota Wild as the result of a trade on June 29, 2022, that sent Kevin Fiala to Los Angeles in exchange for Brock Faber and this pick.
 The Boston Bruins' first-round pick went to the Anaheim Ducks as the result of a trade on March 19, 2022, that sent Hampus Lindholm and Kodie Curran to Boston in exchange for Urho Vaakanainen, John Moore, a second-round pick in both 2023 and 2024 and this pick.
 The Toronto Maple Leafs' first-round pick went to the Chicago Blackhawks as the result of a trade on July 7, 2022, that sent a second-round pick in 2022 (38th overall) to Toronto in exchange for Petr Mrazek and this pick.
 The Calgary Flames' first-round pick went to the Montreal Canadiens as the result of a trade on February 14, 2022, that sent Tyler Toffoli to Calgary in exchange for Tyler Pitlick, Emil Heineman, a fifth-round pick in 2023, a conditional fourth-round pick in 2024 and this pick (being conditional at the time of the trade). The condition – Montreal will receive a first-round pick in 2022 if Calgary's first-round pick is outside of the top ten selections – was converted when the Flames qualified for the 2022 Stanley Cup playoffs on April 16, 2022.
 The Carolina Hurricanes' first-round pick went to the San Jose Sharks as the result of a trade on July 7, 2022, that sent a first-round pick in 2022 (11th overall) to Arizona in exchange for a second-round pick in 2022 (34th overall), the Islanders' second-round pick in 2022 (45th overall) and this pick.
Arizona previously acquired this pick as the result of a trade on September 4, 2021, that sent Christian Dvorak to Montreal in exchange for a second-round pick in 2024 and this pick (being conditional at the time of the trade). The conditions – Arizona will receive the lower of Carolina or Montreal's first-round picks in 2022, if either or both of the selections are in the top ten picks – were converted when Carolina's first-round pick could no longer be in the top ten selections after they qualified for the 2022 Stanley Cup playoffs on April 7, 2022, and when Montreal could finish no better than twenty-fifth overall ensuring that their first-round pick would be in the top ten selections on April 14, 2022.
Montreal previously acquired this pick as compensation for not matching an offer sheet from Carolina to restricted free agent Jesperi Kotkaniemi on September 4, 2021.
 The Florida Panthers' first-round pick went to the Buffalo Sabres as the result of a trade on July 24, 2021, that sent Sam Reinhart to Florida in exchange for Devon Levi and this pick (being conditional at the time of the trade). The condition – Buffalo will receive a first-round pick in 2022 if Florida's first-round pick is outside of the top ten selections – was converted when the Panthers qualified for the 2022 Stanley Cup playoffs on April 3, 2022.
 The Edmonton Oilers' first-round pick went to the Arizona Coyotes as the result of a trade on July 7, 2022, that sent Colorado's first-round pick in 2022 (32nd overall) to Edmonton in exchange for Zack Kassian, a third-round pick in 2024, a second-round pick in 2025 and this pick.
 The New York Rangers' first-round pick went to the Winnipeg Jets as the result of a trade on March 21, 2022, that sent Andrew Copp and a sixth-round pick in 2023 to New York in exchange for Morgan Barron, a conditional second-round pick in 2022, a fifth-round pick in 2023 and this pick (being conditional at the time of the trade). The condition – Winnipeg will receive a first-round pick in 2022 if New York advances to the 2022 Eastern Conference Final and Copp plays in 50% of their playoff games – was converted on May 30, 2022.
 The Colorado Avalanche's first-round pick went to the Edmonton Oilers as the result of a trade on July 7, 2022, that sent Zack Kassian, a first-round pick in 2022 (29th overall), a third-round pick in 2024 and a second-round pick in 2025 to Arizona in exchange for this pick.
Arizona previously acquired this pick as the result of a trade on July 28, 2021, that sent Darcy Kuemper to Colorado in exchange for Conor Timmins, a conditional third-round pick in 2024 and this pick.

Round two

Notes
 The Arizona Coyotes' second-round pick went to the San Jose Sharks as the result of a trade on July 7, 2022, that sent a first-round pick in 2022 (11th overall) to Arizona in exchange for Carolina's first-round pick in 2022 (27th overall), the Islanders' second-round pick in 2022 (45th overall) and this pick.
 The Philadelphia Flyers' second-round pick went to the Arizona Coyotes as the result of a trade on July 22, 2021, that sent future considerations to Philadelphia in exchange for Shayne Gostisbehere, St. Louis' seventh-round pick in 2022 and this pick.
 The New Jersey Devils' second-round pick went to the Washington Capitals as the result of a trade on July 8, 2022, that sent Vitek Vanecek and Winnipeg's second-round pick in 2022 (46th overall) to New Jersey in exchange for a third-round pick in 2022 (70th overall) and this pick.
 The Chicago Blackhawks' second-round pick went to the Toronto Maple Leafs as the result of a trade on July 7, 2022, that sent a first-round pick in 2022 (25th overall) to Chicago in exchange for Petr Mrazek and this pick.
 The Ottawa Senators' second-round pick went to the Chicago Blackhawks as the result of a trade on July 7, 2022, that sent Alex DeBrincat to Ottawa in exchange for a first-round pick in 2022, a third-round pick in 2024 and this pick.
 The San Jose Sharks' second-round pick went to the Arizona Coyotes as the result of a trade on July 17, 2021, that sent Adin Hill and a seventh-round pick in 2022 to San Jose in exchange for Josef Korenar and this pick.
 The New York Islanders' second-round pick went to the San Jose Sharks as the result of a trade on July 7, 2022, that sent a first-round pick in 2022 (11th overall) to Arizona in exchange for Carolina's first-round pick in 2022 (27th overall), a second-round pick in 2022 (34th overall) and this pick.
Arizona previously acquired this pick as the result of a trade on July 17, 2021, that sent future considerations to New York in exchange for Andrew Ladd, Colorado's second-round pick in 2021, a conditional third-round pick in 2023 and this pick (being conditional at the time of the trade). The condition – Arizona will receive the better of Colorado or the Islanders' second-round picks in 2022. – was converted when the Avalanche qualified for the 2022 Stanley Cup playoffs on April 5, 2022, and when the Islanders were eliminated from the playoffs on April 17, 2022.
 The Winnipeg Jets' second-round pick went to the New Jersey Devils as the result of a trade on July 8, 2022, that sent a second and third-round pick in 2022 (37th and 70th overall) to Washington in exchange for Vitek Vanecek and this pick.
Washington previously acquired this pick as the result of a trade on July 26, 2021, that sent Brenden Dillon to Winnipeg in exchange for a second-round pick in 2023 and this pick.
 The Vancouver Canucks' second-round pick went to the Minnesota Wild as the result of a trade on March 21, 2022, that sent Jack McBain to Arizona in exchange for this pick.
Arizona previously acquired this pick as the result of a trade on July 23, 2021, that sent Oliver Ekman-Larsson and Conor Garland to Vancouver in exchange for Jay Beagle, Loui Eriksson, Antoine Roussel, a first-round pick in 2021, a seventh-round pick in 2023 and this pick.
 The Nashville Predators' second-round pick went to the Seattle Kraken as the result of a trade on March 20, 2022, that sent Jeremy Lauzon to Nashville in exchange for this pick.
 The Washington Capitals' second-round pick went to the Detroit Red Wings as the result of a trade on April 12, 2021, that sent Anthony Mantha to Washington in exchange for Richard Panik, Jakub Vrana, a first-round pick in 2021 and this pick.
 The Pittsburgh Penguins' second-round pick went to the Anaheim Ducks as the result of a trade on March 21, 2022, that sent Rickard Rakell to Pittsburgh in exchange for Zach Aston-Reese, Dominik Simon, Calle Clang and this pick.
 The St. Louis Blues' second-round pick went to the Winnipeg Jets as the result of a trade on March 21, 2022, that sent Andrew Copp and a sixth-round pick in 2023 to New York in exchange for Morgan Barron, a conditional first-round pick in 2022, a fifth-round pick in 2023 and this pick (being conditional at the time of the trade). The condition – Winnipeg will receive the Blues' second-round pick in 2022 or a second-round pick in 2023, at Winnipeg's choice  – was converted when the Jets decided to receive the this second-round pick in 2022.
The Rangers previously acquired this pick as the result of a trade on July 23, 2021, that sent Pavel Buchnevich to St. Louis in exchange for Samuel Blais and this pick.
 The Minnesota Wild received a compensatory second-round pick as a result of not signing their 2018 first-round selection Filip Johansson.
 The Minnesota Wild's second-round pick went to the Chicago Blackhawks as the result of a trade on March 21, 2022, that sent Marc-Andre Fleury to Minnesota in exchange for this pick (being conditional at the time of the trade). The condition – Chicago will receive a second-round pick in 2022 if Fleury does not win at least four playoff games and Minnesota fails to advance to the 2022 Western Conference Final – was converted when the Wild were eliminated from the 2022 Stanley Cup playoffs on May 12, 2022.
 The Toronto Maple Leafs' second-round pick went to the Seattle Kraken as the result of a trade on March 20, 2022, that sent Mark Giordano and Colin Blackwell to Toronto in exchange for a second-round pick in 2023, a third-round pick in 2024 and this pick.
 The Florida Panthers' second-round pick went to the Seattle Kraken as the result of a trade on March 16, 2022, that sent Calle Jarnkrok to Calgary in exchange for a third-round pick in 2023, a seventh-round pick in 2024 and this pick.
Calgary previously acquired this pick as the result of a trade April 12, 2021, that sent Sam Bennett and a sixth-round pick in 2022 to Florida in exchange for Emil Heineman and this pick.
 The Edmonton Oilers' second-round pick went to the Montreal Canadiens as the result of a trade on March 21, 2022, that sent Brett Kulak to Edmonton in exchange for William Lagesson, a seventh-round pick in 2024 and this pick (being conditional at the time of the trade). The condition – Montreal will receive a second-round pick in 2022 if Edmonton does not qualify for the 2022 Stanley Cup Finals – was converted on June 6, 2022.
 The Tampa Bay Lightning's second-round pick went to the Ottawa Senators as the result of a trade on December 27, 2020, that sent Marian Gaborik and Anders Nilsson to Tampa Bay in exchange for Braydon Coburn, Cedric Paquette and this pick.
 The Colorado Avalanche's second-round pick went to the New York Islanders as the result of a trade on October 12, 2020, that sent Devon Toews to Colorado in exchange for a second-round pick in 2021 and this pick.

Round three

Notes
 The Montreal Canadiens' third-round pick went to the Chicago Blackhawks as the result of a trade on July 7, 2022, that sent Kirby Dach to Montreal in exchange for the Islanders' first-round pick in 2022 (13th overall) and this pick.
 The New Jersey Devils' third-round pick went to the Washington Capitals as the result of a trade on July 8, 2022, that sent Vitek Vanecek and Winnipeg's second-round pick in 2022 (46th overall) to New Jersey in exchange for a second-round pick in 2022 (37th overall) and this pick.
 The Chicago Blackhawks' third-round pick went to the Carolina Hurricanes as the result of a trade on July 24, 2021, that sent a third-round pick in 2021 to Chicago in exchange for this pick.
 The Detroit Red Wings' third-round pick went to the St. Louis Blues as the result of a trade on July 8, 2022, that sent Ville Husso to Detroit in exchange for this pick.
 The Anaheim Ducks' third-round pick went to the Montreal Canadiens as the result of a trade on July 24, 2021, that sent Chicago's third-round pick in 2021 (76th overall) to Anaheim in exchange for this pick.
 The Columbus Blue Jackets' third-round pick went to the Winnipeg Jets as the result of a trade on January 23, 2021, that sent Patrik Laine and Jack Roslovic to Columbus in exchange for Pierre-Luc Dubois and this pick.
 The Winnipeg Jets' third-round pick went to the Vegas Golden Knights as the result of a trade on July 8, 2022, that sent the Rangers' second-round pick and Chicago's fifth-round pick both in 2022 (95th and 135th overall) to Toronto in exchange for this pick.
Toronto previously acquired this pick as the result of a trade on March 20, 2022, that sent Travis Dermott to Vancouver in exchange for this pick.
Vancouver previously acquired this pick as the result of a trade on July 27, 2021, that sent Nate Schmidt to Winnipeg in exchange for this pick.
 The Vancouver Canucks' third-round pick was re-acquired as the result of a trade on March 20, 2022, that sent Travis Hamonic to Ottawa in exchange for this pick.
Ottawa previously acquired this pick as the result of a trade July 28, 2021, that sent Evgenii Dadonov to Vegas in exchange for Nick Holden and this pick.
Vegas previously acquired this pick as the result of a trade on October 12, 2020, that sent Nate Schmidt to Vancouver in exchange for this pick.
 The Vegas Golden Knights' third-round pick went to the Chicago Blackhawks as the result of a trade on April 12, 2021, that sent Nick DeSimone and a fifth-round pick in 2022 to Vegas in exchange for a second-round pick 2021 and this pick.
 The Los Angeles Kings' third-round pick went to the Nashville Predators as the result of a trade on July 1, 2021, that sent Viktor Arvidsson to Los Angeles in exchange for a second-round pick in 2021 and this pick.
 The Pittsburgh Penguins' third-round pick went to the Tampa Bay Lightning as the result of a trade on July 8, 2022, that sent Chicago's fourth-round pick and Detroit's sixth-round pick both in 2022 (103rd and 169th overall) to Los Angeles in exchange for this pick.
Los Angeles previously acquired this pick as the result of a trade on April 12, 2021, that sent Jeff Carter to Pittsburgh in exchange for a conditional fourth-round pick in 2023 and this pick (being conditional at the time of the trade). The condition – Los Angeles will receive a third-round pick in 2022 if the Penguins do not advance to the 2021 Stanley Cup Finals – was converted when the Penguins were eliminated from the playoffs on May 26, 2021.
 The Boston Bruins' third-round pick went to the Ottawa Senators as the result of a trade on April 11, 2021, that sent Mike Reilly to Boston in exchange for this pick.
 The Toronto Maple Leafs' third-round pick went to the Chicago Blackhawks as the result of a trade on July 28, 2021, that sent Nikita Zadorov to Calgary in exchange for this pick.
Calgary previously acquired this pick as the result of a trade on April 11, 2021, that sent David Rittich to Toronto in exchange for this pick.
 The Calgary Flames' third-round pick went to the Seattle Kraken as the result of a trade on July 8, 2022, that sent Washington's fourth-round pick in 2022 (117th overall) and a fifth-round pick in 2022 (132nd overall) to Boston in exchange for this pick.
Boston previously acquired this pick as the result of a trade on July 28, 2021, that sent Daniel Vladar to Calgary in exchange for this pick.
 The Carolina Hurricanes' third-round pick went to the Montreal Canadiens as compensation for not matching an offer sheet from Carolina to restricted free agent Jesperi Kotkaniemi on September 4, 2021.
 The Edmonton Oilers' third-round pick went to the Arizona Coyotes as the result of a trade on July 8, 2022, that sent Dallas' third-round pick in 2023 to Chicago in exchange for this pick.
Chicago previously acquired this pick as the result of a trade on July 12, 2021, that sent Duncan Keith and Tim Soderlund to Edmonton in exchange for Caleb Jones and this pick (being conditional at the time of the trade). The condition – Chicago will receive a third-round pick in 2022 if Edmonton does not qualify for the 2022 Stanley Cup Finals – was converted on June 6, 2022.
 The New York Rangers' third-round pick went to the Toronto Maple Leafs as the result of a trade on July 8, 2022, that sent Winnipeg's third-round pick in 2022 (79th overall) to Vegas in exchange for Chicago's fifth-round pick in 2022 (135th overall) and this pick.
Vegas previously acquired this pick as the result of a trade on July 29, 2021, that sent Ryan Reaves to New York in exchange for this pick.
 The Tampa Bay Lightning's third-round pick went to the Columbus Blue Jackets as the result of a trade on April 10, 2021, that sent Brian Lashoff to Tampa Bay in exchange for a first-round pick in 2021 and this pick.
 The Colorado Avalanche's third-round pick went to the New York Rangers as the result of a trade on July 7, 2022, that sent Alexandar Georgiev to Colorado in exchange for a third-round pick in 2023, a fifth-round pick in 2022 and this pick.

Round four

Notes
 The Montreal Canadiens' fourth-round pick went to the New York Islanders as the result of a trade on July 7, 2022, that sent a first-round pick in 2022 (13th overall) to Montreal in exchange for Alexander Romanov and this pick.
 The Arizona Coyotes' fourth-round pick went to the Winnipeg Jets as the result of a trade on March 21, 2022, that sent Bryan Little and Nathan Smith to Arizona in exchange for this pick.
 The Philadelphia Flyers' fourth-round pick went to the Carolina Hurricanes as the result of a trade on July 8, 2022, that sent Tony DeAngelo and a seventh-round pick in 2022 (220th overall) to Philadelphia in exchange for a conditional third-round pick in 2023, a second-round pick in 2024 and this pick.
 The Chicago Blackhawks' fourth-round pick went to the Los Angeles Kings as the result of a trade on July 8, 2022, that sent Pittsburgh's third-round pick in 2022 (86th overall) to Tampa Bay in exchange for Detroit's sixth-round pick in 2022 (169th overall) and this pick.
Tampa Bay previously acquired this pick as the result of a trade on March 18, 2022, that sent Boris Katchouk, Taylor Raddysh, a conditional first-round pick in 2023 and 2024 to Chicago in exchange for Brandon Hagel, a fourth-round pick in 2024 and this pick.
 The New York Islanders' fourth-round pick went to the New Jersey Devils as the result of a trade on April 7, 2021, that sent Kyle Palmieri and Travis Zajac to New York in exchange for A. J. Greer, Mason Jobst, a first-round pick in 2021 and this pick (being conditional at the time of the trade). The condition – New Jersey will receive a fourth-round pick in 2022 if the Islanders do not advance to the 2021 Stanley Cup Finals – was converted when the Islanders were eliminated from the 2021 Stanley Cup playoffs on June 25, 2021.
 The Winnipeg Jets' fourth-round pick went to the New York Rangers as the result of a trade on July 17, 2021, that sent Brett Howden to Vegas in exchange for Nick DeSimone and this pick.
Vegas previously acquired this pick as the result of a trade on October 9, 2020, that sent Paul Stastny to Winnipeg in exchange for Carl Dahlstrom and this pick (being conditional at the time of the trade). The condition – Vegas will receive a fourth-round pick in 2022 if Stastny plays in five games during the 2020–21 NHL season for Winnipeg – was converted on January 23, 2021.
 The Vegas Golden Knights' fourth-round pick went to the Detroit Red Wings as the result of a trade on October 7, 2020, that sent a fourth-round pick in 2020 (125th overall) to Vegas in exchange for this pick.
 The Washington Capitals' fourth-round pick went to the Boston Bruins as the result of a trade on July 8, 2022, that sent Calgary's third-round pick in 2022 (91st overall) to Seattle in exchange for a fifth-round pick in 2022 (132nd overall) and this pick.
Seattle previously acquired this pick as the result of a trade on March 21, 2022, that sent Marcus Johansson to Washington in exchange for Daniel Sprong, a sixth-round pick in 2023 and this pick.
 The Toronto Maple Leafs' fourth-round pick was re-acquired as the result of a trade on July 8, 2022, that sent a fourth-round pick in 2023 to Nashville in exchange for this pick.
Nashville previously acquired this pick as the result of a trade on June 30, 2022, that sent Mathieu Olivier to Columbus in exchange for this pick.
Columbus previously acquired this pick as the result of a trade on April 11, 2021, that sent Stefan Noesen to Toronto in exchange for a first-round pick in 2021 and this pick.
 The Calgary Flames' fourth-round pick went to the Seattle Kraken as the result of a trade on July 22, 2021, that sent Tyler Pitlick to Calgary in exchange for this pick.
 The Edmonton Oilers' fourth-round pick went to the New Jersey Devils as the result of a trade on April 12, 2021, that sent Dmitry Kulikov to Edmonton in exchange for this pick (being conditional at the time of the trade). The condition – New Jersey will receive a fourth-round pick in 2022 if the Oilers do not advance to the Second Round of the 2021 Stanley Cup playoffs – was converted when the Oilers were eliminated from the playoffs on May 24, 2021.
 The New York Rangers' fourth-round pick went to the Montreal Canadiens as the result of a trade on March 16, 2022, that sent Ben Chiarot to Florida in exchange for Ty Smilanic, a conditional first-round pick in 2023 and this pick being conditional at the time of the trade). The condition – Montreal will receive the lowest of the Rangers' or Jets' fourth-round pick in 2022. – was converted when the Rangers clinched a spot in the 2022 Stanley Cup playoffs on April 9, 2022, and when the Jets were eliminated from the playoffs on April 20, 2022.
Florida previously acquired this pick as the result of a trade on March 16, 2022, that sent Frank Vatrano to New York in exchange for this conditional pick.
 The Tampa Bay Lightning's fourth-round pick went to the Vegas Golden Knights as the result of a trade on July 8, 2022, that sent a fourth-round pick in 2023 to Montreal in exchange for this pick.
Montreal previously acquired this pick as the result of a trade on July 24, 2021, that sent Vegas' fourth-round pick in 2021 (126th overall) to Tampa Bay in exchange for this pick.
 The Colorado Avalanche's fourth-round pick went to the Detroit Red Wings as the result of a trade on April 9, 2021, that sent Patrik Nemeth to Colorado in exchange for this pick.

Round five

Notes
 The Seattle Kraken's fifth-round pick went to the Boston Bruins as the result of a trade on July 8, 2022, that sent Calgary's third-round pick in 2022 (91st overall) to Seattle in exchange for Washington's fourth-round pick in 2022 (117th overall) and this pick.
 The New Jersey Devils' fifth-round pick went to the Buffalo Sabres as the result of a trade on July 28, 2021, that sent future considerations to New Jersey in exchange for Will Butcher and this pick.
 The Chicago Blackhawks' fifth-round pick went to the Toronto Maple Leafs as the result of a trade on July 8, 2022, that sent Winnipeg's third-round pick in 2022 (79th overall) to Vegas in exchange for the Rangers' third-round pick in 2022 (95th overall) and this pick.
Vegas previously acquired this pick as the result of a trade on April 12, 2021, that sent a second-round pick in 2021 and a third-round pick in 2022 to Chicago in exchange for Nick DeSimone and this pick.
 The Buffalo Sabres' fifth-round pick went to the Columbus Blue Jackets as the result of a trade on July 8, 2022, that sent a fifth-round pick in 2023 to San Jose in exchange for this pick.
San Jose previously acquired this pick as the result of a trade on April 12, 2021, that sent Mattias Janmark to Vegas in exchange for this pick.
Vegas previously acquired this pick as the result of a trade on June 28, 2019, that sent Colin Miller to Buffalo in exchange for St. Louis' second-round pick in 2021 and this pick.
 The San Jose Sharks' fifth-round pick was re-acquired as the result of a trade on March 21, 2022, that sent Jake Middleton to Minnesota in exchange for Kaapo Kahkonen and this pick.
Minnesota previously acquired this pick as the result of a trade on October 5, 2020, that sent Devan Dubnyk and a seventh-round pick in 2022 to San Jose in exchange for this pick.
 The Columbus Blue Jackets' fifth-round pick went to the New Jersey Devils as the result of a trade on February 25, 2019, that sent Keith Kinkaid to Columbus in exchange for this pick.
 The Winnipeg Jets' fifth-round pick went to the Ottawa Senators as the result of a trade on March 21, 2022, that sent Zach Sanford to Winnipeg in exchange for this pick.
 The Boston Bruins' fifth-round pick went to the Ottawa Senators as the result of a trade on March 21, 2022, that sent Josh Brown and a conditional seventh-round pick in 2022 to Boston in exchange for Zach Senyshyn and this pick.
 The Toronto Maple Leafs' fifth-round pick went to the Anaheim Ducks as the result of a trade on April 12, 2021, that sent Ben Hutton to Toronto in exchange for this pick.
 The Colorado Avalanche's fifth-round pick went to the New York Rangers as the result of a trade on July 7, 2022, that sent Alexandar Georgiev to Colorado in exchange for a third-round pick in both 2022 and 2023 and this pick.

Round six

Notes
 The Chicago Blackhawks' sixth-round pick went to the Pittsburgh Penguins as the result of a trade on July 8, 2022, that sent Liam Gorman to Chicago in exchange for this pick.
 The Detroit Red Wings' sixth-round pick went to the Los Angeles Kings as the result of a trade on July 8, 2022, that sent Pittsburgh's third-round pick in 2022 (86th overall) to Tampa Bay in exchange for Chicago's fourth-round pick in 2022 (103rd overall) and this pick.
Tampa Bay previously acquired this pick as the result of a trade on July 30, 2021, that sent Mitchell Stephens to Detroit in exchange for this pick.
 The Anaheim Ducks' sixth-round pick went to the Carolina Hurricanes as the result of a trade on April 12, 2021, that sent Haydn Fleury to Anaheim in exchange for Jani Hakanpaa and this pick.
 The Columbus Blue Jackets' sixth-round pick went to the Chicago Blackhawks as the result of a trade on July 23, 2021, that sent Adam Boqvist, a first and second-round pick both in 2021 (12th and 44th overall) and a conditional first-round pick in 2022 to Columbus in exchange for Seth Jones, Tampa Bay's first-round pick in 2021 and this pick.
 The Nashville Predators' sixth-round pick went to the Anaheim Ducks as the result of a trade on February 24, 2020, that sent Korbinian Holzer to Nashville in exchange for Matt Irwin and this pick.
 The Toronto Maple Leafs' sixth-round pick went to the Florida Panthers as the result of a trade on March 21, 2022, that sent Tyler Inamoto to Columbus in exchange for Max Domi and this pick.
Columbus previously acquired this pick as the result of a trade on April 9, 2021, that sent Riley Nash to Toronto in exchange for this pick (being conditional at the time of the trade). The condition – Columbus will receive a sixth-round pick in 2022 if Nash plays in 25% of the Maple Leafs' games during the 2021 Stanley Cup playoffs – was converted when Toronto was eliminated from the 2021 Stanley Cup playoffs with Nash having played two of the Maple Leafs' seven playoff games on May 31, 2021.
 The Calgary Flames' sixth-round pick went to the Buffalo Sabres as the result of a trade on March 20, 2022, that sent Robert Hagg to Florida in exchange for this pick.
Florida previously acquired this pick as the result of a trade April 12, 2021, that sent Emil Heineman and a second-round pick in 2022 to Calgary in exchange for Sam Bennett and this pick.
 The Carolina Hurricanes' sixth-round pick went to the Chicago Blackhawks as the result of a trade on July 8, 2022, that sent a sixth-round pick in 2023 to Carolina in exchange for this pick.

Round seven

Notes
 The Arizona Coyotes' seventh-round pick went to the San Jose Sharks as the result of a trade on July 17, 2021, that sent Josef Korenar and a second-round pick in 2022 to Arizona in exchange for Adin Hill and this pick.
 The Ottawa Senators' seventh-round pick went to the Boston Bruins as the result of a trade on March 21, 2022, that sent Zach Senyshyn and a fifth-round pick in 2022 to Ottawa in exchange for Josh Brown and this pick (being conditional at the time of the trade). The condition – Boston will receive a seventh-round pick in 2022 if Senyshyn plays in fewer than five games for the Senators before the conclusion of the 2021–22 NHL season – was converted when it was no longer possible for Senyshyn to play in five games for Ottawa in the 2021–22 season on April 26, 2022.
 The Anaheim Ducks' seventh-round pick went to the Columbus Blue Jackets as the result of a trade on October 7, 2020, that sent a seventh-round pick in 2020 to Anaheim in exchange for this pick (being conditional at the time of the trade). The condition – Columbus will receive a seventh-round pick in 2022 if the pick is available at the time of the selection – was converted when the pick became available after an earlier conditional trade with Edmonton was resolved on April 8, 2021.
 The San Jose Sharks' seventh-round pick went to the Arizona Coyotes as the result of a trade on July 8, 2022, that sent Vancouver's seventh-round pick in 2023 to San Jose in exchange for this pick.
San Jose previously re-acquired this pick as the result of a trade on October 24, 2021, that sent Dylan Gambrell to Ottawa in exchange for this pick.
Ottawa previously acquired this pick as the result of a trade on January 27, 2021, that sent Christian Jaros to San Jose in exchange for Jack Kopacka and this pick.
 The Columbus Blue Jackets' seventh-round pick went to the Carolina Hurricanes as the result of a trade on February 13, 2021, that sent Gregory Hofmann to Columbus in exchange for this pick.
 The New York Islanders' seventh-round pick went to the Ottawa Senators as the result of a trade on April 11, 2021, that sent Braydon Coburn to New York in exchange for this pick.
 The Dallas Stars' seventh-round pick went to the Buffalo Sabres as the result of a trade on June 10, 2022, that sent future considerations to Dallas in exchange for Ben Bishop and this pick.
 The Los Angeles Kings' seventh-round pick went to the Detroit Red Wings as the result of a trade on March 20, 2022, that sent Troy Stecher to Los Angeles in exchange for this pick.
 The Pittsburgh Penguins' seventh-round pick went to the Florida Panthers as the result of a trade on July 8, 2022, that sent a seventh-round pick in 2023 to Pittsburgh in exchange for this pick.
 The Boston Bruins' seventh-round pick went to the Los Angeles Kings as the result of a trade on July 8, 2022, that sent a seventh-round pick in 2023 to Boston in exchange for this pick.
 The St. Louis Blues' seventh-round pick went to the Montreal Canadiens as the result of a trade on July 24, 2021, that sent a seventh-round pick in 2021 to Arizona in exchange for this pick.
Arizona previously acquired this pick as the result of a trade on July 22, 2021, that sent future considerations to Philadelphia in exchange for Shayne Gostisbehere, a second-round pick in 2022 and this pick.
Philadelphia previously acquired this pick as the result of a trade on April 12, 2021, that sent Erik Gustafsson to Montreal in exchange for this pick.
Montreal previously acquired this pick as the result of a trade on September 2, 2020, that sent Washington's third-round pick and Chicago's seventh-round pick both in 2020 to St. Louis in exchange for Jake Allen and this pick.
 The Minnesota Wild's seventh-round pick went to the San Jose Sharks as the result of a trade on October 5, 2020, that sent a fifth-round pick in 2022 to Minnesota in exchange for Devan Dubnyk and this pick.
 The Carolina Hurricanes' seventh-round pick went to the Philadelphia Flyers as the result of a trade on July 8, 2022, that sent a fourth-round pick in 2022 (101st overall), a conditional third-round pick in 2023 and a second-round pick in 2024 to Carolina in exchange for Tony DeAngelo and this pick.
 The New York Rangers' seventh-round pick went to the Tampa Bay Lightning as the result of a trade on July 17, 2021, that sent Barclay Goodrow to New York in exchange for this pick.

Draftees based on nationality

North American draftees by state/province

Broadcasting
In Canada, coverage of every round of the draft was televised on Sportsnet.

In United States, coverage of the opening round of the draft was televised on ESPN and ESPN+. Coverage of the second day of the draft was televised on NHLN and ESPN+.

See also
 2018–19 NHL transactions
 2019–20 NHL transactions
 2020–21 NHL transactions
 2021–22 NHL transactions
 2022–23 NHL transactions
 2022–23 NHL season
 List of first overall NHL draft picks
 List of NHL players

References

External links
2022 NHL Entry Draft player stats at The Internet Hockey Database

NHL Entry Draft
National Hockey League Entry Draft
2020s in Montreal
Ice hockey in Montreal
Entry Draft
NHL Entry Draft